Batna is the main city and commune of Batna Province, Algeria. With a population of 290,645 (2008 census) it is the fifth largest city in Algeria. It is also one of the principal cities of the Chaoui area and is considered the capital of Aurès.

History

The first solid foundations (a military encampment) of the city were erected by a French garrison in 1844, with a strategic mission to create a permanently guarded access point for the main Sahara road.
Batna's geographical location offers a natural break through the Atlas Mountains. The Romans did not detect this passage in their early invasion phase.
The ancient cities of Timgad and Lambese, built around the first century CE, are living examples of the importance that the Romans gave to commercial control over the region.

Signature and proclamation of the Algerian revolution Batna

The inhabitants of the city revolted  against the French authorities at the beginning of colonization. Thereafter they organized the Algerian revolution against French colonialism.

The first Batneens adhered to Messali Hadj (PPP), as did the Ulemas Ben Badis and the Movement for the Triumph of Democratic Freedoms (MTLD), and together they organized the great historic summit of 22, June 25, 1954.

The Algerian revolution started at Batna under the chairmanship of Batnéen Mustapha Benboulaïd (FLN). Batna was the first military region of Algeria (zone 1) (1954–1962). 
On the night of November 1, 1954, the barracks of the city of Batna were attacked by the mujahedeen. 
Batna was the command headquarters of the Algerian revolution until independence.

Bombing 

On September 6, 2007, Batna saw a massive Al-Qaeda suicide bombing. The bombing, which took place shortly before the visit of Algerian President Abdelaziz Bouteflika, resulted in approximately 15–20 deaths and 107 injuries as the bomber detonated his device among a crowd waiting to see the President, who was at the end of a three-day tour of eastern Algeria. The bombings were condemned by the UN Security Council.

Historical population

Climate 

Summers are moderately hot (by Saharan standards) and dry and winters are chilly and wetter, with the possibility of snowfall.

Entertainment 

Many entertainment resorts are spread across the town. Regarding sports activities the most important destinations are the 1st November Stadium (Stade du premier Novembre), and Seffouhi Stadium, which is used mainly for soccer clubs and festivals (CAB & MSPB are the biggest teams in the city), in addition to the Scholar Stadium. For children, an attraction park is located in Kechida, which is approximately a ten-minute drive from the downtown area.

Dining and nightlife 
With regard to night life, due to some religious and cultural limitations, there are almost no night clubs in the city. However, the existing nightlife is concentrated in the heart of the city, around Les allées Benboulaïd and "STAND" areas, especially during summer break. Downtown Batna has plenty of cafés, traditional restaurants (Chouwaya) or GARGOUTTIER, Pizzerias, French and oriental bakeries, and a limited number of luxury restaurants. Many festivities take place in allées Ben Boulaïd area, mainly in the season of International Timgad Festival (usually between 4–15 July every year). The most attractive exciting places surrounding the city are, Lambese (also called Lambaesis),  Timgad, Ghoufi, Chelaalaa, and Belezma National Park.

Administration

Districts and urban areas of the city 

Town center

Le Quartier du Stand

Bouzourane

Cité 20 Août

Hai An Nasr

Cité 84 Log.

Cité Chikhi

Cité 800 Log.

Cité 500 Log.

Cité 1020 Log.

Kechida

Erriadh

Moudjahidines

Cité 1272 Log.

La SAE

Tamechit

Sonatiba

Cité Chouhada

Kemmouni

El Boustane

Bouakal

Z'Mala

Douar Eddis

Ezzohour

Cité Lombarakia

Parc à fourrage

Cité Zemmouri

Cité Salsabil

Cité Bouarif

Route de Tazoult

La Zone Militaire

La Zone Industrielle Batna

Notable residents
 Houria Aïchi, musician
 Ali Benflis, Former Head of Government of Algeria 
 Marcel Deviq, French engineer and politician
 Rachid Mouffouk, sculptor
 Liamine Zéroual, sixth President of Algeria

References

External links 

Travel Batna

 
Populated places established in 1844
Communes of Batna Province
Chaoui people
Province seats of Algeria